Valentina Illarionovna Talyzina (born January 22, 1935)  is a Soviet and Russian film and stage actress, People's Artist of the RSFSR (1985). Awarded the Order of Honor (2005)  and the Order of Friendship (2010). Member of the Communist Party of the Soviet Union in 1964.

Biography

Early life
Valentina  Talyzina was born on January 22, 1935, in Omsk. Valentina's father was Illarion Grigorievich Talyzin, a Russified Tatar, and her mother was Anastasia Trifonovna Talyzina. When Valentina Talyzina was an infant, her family moved to Baranavichy.

Career
Between 1952-1954 she studied at the Omsk Agricultural Institute.

In 1954 Valentina Talyzina was admitted to the Russian Academy of Theatre Arts. She graduated from the Academy in 1958. In the same year she became part of the Mossovet Theatre troupe.

In cinema Valentina debuted in 1963 in the role of Inna in the detective film The Man who Doubts. But the actress began to actively act in film only in the late 1960s. One of the first big successes Talyzina on the screen was the role of Nadya in the adventure film Road to Saturn.

Valentina Talyzina acted in the film The Irony of Fate and also voiced the main character because Barbara Brylska, who played Nadia, had an obvious Polish accent.

For her performance in the television series Lines of Fate, Valentina Talyzina received the Golden Eagle Award as Best Television Actress in 2004.

In March 2014 Talyzina signed a letter in support of the 2014 Russian annexation of Crimea. She was banned from entering Ukraine, along with many other Russian artists and entertainers.

Family
 Father —  Illarion Grigorievich Talyzin, from Russified Tatar. 
 Mother —  Anastasia Trifonovna Talyzina.
 Ex-husband —   painter Leonid Nepomnyashchy.
 Daughter —  Ksenia Khairova, also an actress, granddaughter Anastasia (1998).

Selected filmography  
Total over 138 movies.

 1968 The Road to 'Saturn' as Nadya
 1968 Zigzag of Success (Зигзаг удачи) as Alevtina Vasilyevna
 1971 Grandads-Robbers (Старики-разбойники) as Fedyaev's secretary
 1972 Big School-Break (Большая перемена) as school chemical teacher
 1974 Unbelievable Adventures of Italians in Russia (Невероятные приключения итальянцев в России) as hostess in the hotel
 1974 Agony (Агония) as Aglaia
 1975 Afonya (Афоня) as Vostryakova
 1975 The Irony of Fate (Ирония судьбы, или С лёгким паром!) as Nadya (voice) / Valya
 1979 The Luncheon on the Grass (Завтрак на траве) as Anna Petrovna
 1981 Say a Word for the Poor Hussar (О бедном гусаре замолвите слово…) as Anna Speshneva
 1983 Crazy Day of Engineer Barkasov (Безумный день инженера Баркасова) as Kobylina
 1984 TASS Is Authorized to Declare... (ТАСС уполномочен заявить...) as Pilar (voice)
 1985 Guest from the Future (Гостья из будущего) as Mariya Pavlovna
 1985 After the Rain, on Thursday (После дождичка в четверг) as Varvara
 1989 Investigation Held by ZnaToKi (Следствие ведут ЗнаТоКи)
 1991 Genius (Гений) as Lubov Smirnova
 2000 Old Hags (Старые клячи) as cleaning woman
 2003 Lines of Fate (Линии судьбы) as Rosa Sergeevna
 2007 The Irony of Fate 2 (Ирония Судьбы. Продолжение) as Nadya (voice) / Valya
 2009 Attack on Leningrad (Ленинград) as Valentina

References

External links
 

1935 births
Living people
People from Baranavichy
Soviet film actresses
Russian film actresses
Soviet television actresses
Russian television actresses
Soviet stage actresses
Russian stage actresses
20th-century Russian actresses
21st-century Russian actresses
Soviet voice actresses
Russian voice actresses
Recipients of the Order of Honour (Russia)
People's Artists of the RSFSR
Russian Academy of Theatre Arts alumni
Communist Party of the Soviet Union members